Comyns can refer to:

People
 Arthur Comyns Carr (1882–1965), English politician 
 Barbara Comyns Carr (1907–1992), English author
 Comyns Berkeley (1865–1946), obstetric physician
 Ethel Harriet Comyns-Lewer (1861–1946), British ornithologist and periodical editor, publisher and owner
 John Comyns (1667–1740), English judge
 Joseph Comyns Carr (1849–1916), English art critic and theatre manager
 Louis Comyns (1904–1962), British politician
 Tom Comyns (born 1973), Irish Olympic sprinter
 William Comyns Beaumont (1873–1956), British journalist

Other
 Comyns' Digest, book by John Comyns

See also
 Comins (disambiguation)
 Comyn (disambiguation)